Luca Marinelli (born 22 October 1984) is an Italian actor.

He is best known for the roles of Guido in Every Blessed Day (2012), Andrea in The Great Beauty (2013), Cesare in Don't Be Bad (2015), The Gipsy in They Call Me Jeeg (2016), the title character of Martin Eden (2019), Nicky in The Old Guard (2020), and the title character of Diabolik (2021).

Biography 
Born in Rome, Luca Marinelli is the son of actor and voice actor , and the nephew of actress and voice actress . He enrolled at the Silvio D'Amico National Academy of Dramatic Art, graduating in 2009.  Occasionally appearing on stage since 2006, his breakout role was Mattia, the leading character in the Saverio Costanzo's 2010 drama film The Solitude of Prime Numbers. In 2013 he was appointed EFP Shooting Star at the Berlin International Film Festival for his performance in Paolo Virzì's Every Blessed Day. Marinelli also played a supporting role in the Academy Award-winning drama The Great Beauty by Paolo Sorrentino.

For his role of Cesare in Claudio Caligari's final film Don't Be Bad, he won the Pasinetti Award for Best Actor at the 72nd Venice International Film Festival.

In 2016 he won the Nastro d'Argento and David di Donatello for Best Supporting Actor for They Call Me Jeeg, and in 2019 he won the Volpi Cup for Best Actor for his portrayal of the titular character Martin Eden at the 76th Venice International Film Festival. He also played the antagonist Primo in the 2018 TV series Trust, and starred as Nicky in the Netflix film The Old Guard. In 2018 he portrayed the Italian singer-songwriter Fabrizio De André in Fabrizio De André: Principe libero.

He starred as Diabolik in the 2021 film based on the comics series.

Filmography

Awards and nominations

Ex-aequo with Toni Servillo for The Girl in the Fog.

References

External links 

 

1984 births
Male actors from Rome
Italian male stage actors
Italian male film actors
Italian male television actors
Living people
21st-century Italian male actors
People of Apulian descent
Accademia Nazionale di Arte Drammatica Silvio D'Amico alumni
David di Donatello winners
Volpi Cup for Best Actor winners